John Raymond 'Jack' Fifield is an Australian former rugby league footballer who played in the 1950s.

Career
Fifield was graded from Balmain's Presidents Cup in 1949  played 5 seasons for the Balmain club between 1950-1955 and captained the club on numerous occasions. He then joined St. George for two seasons in 1957 and 1958. He won a premiership with St. George, playing centre in the 1957 Grand Final.

Fifield was the nephew of Cec Fifield, the brilliant Kangaroo centre (1929-1930). 

Fifield retired after the  1958 season.

References

Balmain Tigers players
St. George Dragons players
Australian rugby league players
Living people
Year of birth missing (living people)
Rugby league centres
Place of birth missing (living people)